PS Basel is a football club based in Toboali, Bangka Belitung Islands. They are currently playing at Liga 3 and their homebase is Junjung Besaoh Stadium.

Honours
 Liga 3 Bangka Belitung Islands
 Champions: 2018

References

External links
 

Football clubs in Bangka Belitung Islands
Football clubs in Indonesia
Association football clubs established in 2012
2012 establishments in Indonesia